Green Inlet Marine Provincial Park is a provincial park in British Columbia, Canada, located in the North Coast region to the southeast of Butedale and containing 33 ha.

References

North Coast of British Columbia
Provincial parks of British Columbia
1992 establishments in British Columbia
Protected areas established in 1992
Marine parks of Canada